The twentieth government of Israel was formed by Yitzhak Shamir of Likud on 10 October 1983, following the resignation of Prime Minister Menachen Begin on 28 August.

Shamir kept the same coalition partners as the previous government, i.e. the National Religious Party, Agudat Yisrael, Tami and the Movement for the Renewal of Social Zionism. The coalition held 62 of the 120 seats in the Knesset. All ministers kept their roles from the previous government, with the only changes being that Shamir replaced Begin as Prime Minister (whilst keeping the Foreign Affairs portfolio), Pesah Grupper being promoted from Deputy Minister of Agriculture (also replacing Begin, who had held the portfolio before), Mordechai Tzipori losing his Deputy Minister of Defense role, and Yehuda Ben-Meir becoming Deputy Minister of Foreign Affairs.

The government held office until 19 September the following year, when the twenty-first government was formed following the July 1984 elections.

Cabinet members

1 Although Arens was not an MK at the time, he had been elected to the Knesset on the Likud list.

References

External links
Eighth Knesset: Government 20 Knesset website

 20
1983 establishments in Israel
1984 disestablishments in Israel
Cabinets established in 1983
Cabinets disestablished in 1984
1983 in Israeli politics
1984 in Israeli politics
 20